General elections were held in Costa Rica on 11 February 1940. Rafael Ángel Calderón Guardia of the Independent National Republican Party won the presidential election. Voter turnout was 80.8% in the presidential election and 65.6% in the parliamentary election.

Since 1938, two tendencies had begun to emerge in the ranks of the Republican Party, one revolving around the popular ex president Ricardo Jiménez Oreamuno and another around the young doctor and charismatic politician Rafael Angel Calderón Guardia. Jiménez, however, an old man, would gradually leave power and influence, and the "Jimenismo" lost ground to Calderonismo, which also has full support from the government chaired by León Cortés Castro who pressures Jiménez into retirement.

To prevent a triumph of the Calderonismo a coalition was tried between the Communist Party, a faction of the jimenismo and the Social Democratic Guanacastecan Brotherhood called National Democratic Alliance, nevertheless when Jiménez declines to be candidate this is broken so the parties that integrate it ran separately. During the National Republican Convention Calderón is selected presidential nominee and wins the elections.

Results

President

References

1940 elections in Central America
1940 in Costa Rica
Elections in Costa Rica